My Brother… Nikhil is a 2005 Indian film set in Goa, based on the life of Dominic d'Souza. The movie portrays the life of the protagonist, Nikhil, from 1987 to 1994, when AIDS awareness in India was considerably low. Onir, the film director, stated that the film is based on true historical fact, and the standard disclaimer about fictitious content was just a compromise with the Indian government to gain permission to make the film.

Plot
This film is set in Goa between 1986 and 1994. Nikhil Kapoor (Sanjay Suri) is the state all round swimming champion. His father Navin Kapoor (Victor Banerjee) has raised his son to be a sports man, a dream that he never achieved for himself. His elder sister Anamika (Juhi Chawla) teaches in a primary school and loves him dearly. His mother Anita Rosario Kapoor (Lillete Dubey) adores him and from her he inherited his artistic side to his personality.

After Nikhil is diagnosed with HIV his life falls apart. He is removed from the swimming team and his parents throw him out of their house. One day he is arrested because he is HIV positive. He is kept in forced isolation by law as the Goa Public Health Act allowed the government to isolate HIV positive people. His parents desert him and his friends move away. The only people who stand by him are his sister Anamika, her boyfriend Sam (Gautam Kapoor) and his friend Nigel (Purab Kohli). Despite facing threats from the community, Anamika and Nigel are able to secure his release with the help of a lawyer. Nikhil is unable to find a job at first, but then becomes a music teacher. Anamika and Nigel start an AIDS assistance organization called People Positive. As Nikhil develops AIDS he is reconciled with his mother and finally his father. After Nikhil's death, his parents begin to treat Nigel like a son.

Reception
The film was highly appreciated worldwide and Juhi Chawla won the Zee Best Actress Critic Award for her performance.

Cast

 Sanjay Suri as Nikhil Kapoor
 Juhi Chawla as Anamika
 Victor Banerjee as Navin Kapoor
 Lilette Dubey as Anita Rosario Kapoor
 Purab Kohli as Nigel D'Costa
 Dipannita Sharma as Leena Gomes
 Shayan Munshi as Kelly Menzes
 Gautam Kapoor as Sam Fernandes
 Peeya Rai Chowdhary as Catherine
 Sujoy Ghosh in a Special Appearance
 Dia Mirza in a Special Appearance

Soundtrack

References

External links
 
 
 My Brother... Nikhil, New York Times review
 My Brother... Nikhil, AfterElton review

2005 films
2000s Hindi-language films
HIV/AIDS in Indian films
Indian LGBT-related films
Films set in 1987
Films set in 1994
Films set in Goa
LGBT-related films based on actual events
Films distributed by Yash Raj Films
2005 LGBT-related films
2005 directorial debut films